The second season of Rising Star Indonesia an Indonesian reality singing television competition aired on RCTI. Judika, Anang Hermansyah, Ariel "Noah" and Rossa are appointed as the experts. Boy William, Nirina Zubir and Robby Purba are appointed as hosts. The winner of which receives a 1 billion rupiahs recording contract with Hits Record. The second season aired on 12 December 2016 and is produced by RCTI in-house production and led by Fabian Dharmawan. This season, the competition was won by Andmesh Kamaleng after received 80 percent in the final round.

Auditions 

The open call auditions were held in the following locations:

Room audition

Audition 1 (December 12)

Audition 2 (December 13)

Audition 3 (December 19)

Audition 4 (December 20)

Live audition

Live test (December 20)

Audition 1 (December 26)

Audition 2 (December 27)

Audition 3 (January 2)

Audition 4 (January 3)

Audition 5 (January 9)

Audition 6 (January 10)

Live Duels

Duels 1 (January 16)

Duels 2 (January 17)

Duels 3 (January 23)

Duels 4 (January 24)

Final duels

Final duels 1 (January 30)

Final duels 2 (January 31)

Finalist

Elimination stage

Top 12 (February 6)

Top 10 (February 13) 

Non-performance

Top 9 (February 20)

Top 8 (February 27) 

Non-performance

Top 7 (March 6) 

Non-performance

Top 6 (March 13) 

Non-performance

Semi-final (March 20) 

Non-performance

Finale (March 27) 
 First Round
In the first round, expert's vote each worth 5%

 Finale Round
In the finale round, expert's vote each worth 3%. 
Both voting results from the first round and the final round will be accumulated. The highest score will be the winner of Rising Star Indonesia. 

 Non Performance

Elimination table 

Notes

Contestant who appeared on other talent shows 
 Thasya Kenang, Chandra Aditya, Tiffany Geraldine and Siti Saniyah previously auditioned for The Voice Indonesia in 2016.
 Salma Salsabilla previously auditioned for The Voice Kids Indonesia in 2016 from team Agnez Mo where she was eliminated in the Battle Rounds.
 Innocent Purwanto (Part of Fade In) previously auditioned for Rising Star Indonesia Season 1.

References

External links 
 Official website

Rising Star (franchise)
2016 Indonesian television seasons
2017 Indonesian television seasons